Vriesea ensiformis is a plant species in the genus Vriesea. This species is endemic to Brazil.

Cultivars
 Vriesea 'Aurora Major'
 Vriesea 'Aurora Minor'
 Vriesea 'Copper Penny'
 Vriesea 'Davis(ii)'
 Vriesea 'Derek's Dilemma'
 Vriesea 'Favorite'
 Vriesea 'Furcata'
 Vriesea 'Karamea Bronze Queen'
 Vriesea 'Lav (Lavender)'
 Vriesea 'Perfidia'
 Vriesea 'Po Boy'
 Vriesea 'Ralph Davis'
 Vriesea 'RaRu'
 Vriesea 'Ruby Lee'
 Vriesea 'Son of Yellow Tail'
 Vriesea 'Vista Charm'
 Vriesea 'Warmingii Minor'
 Vriesea 'Witte Senior'
 × Guzvriesea 'Star Fire'
 × Vriecantarea 'Inferno'
 × Vrieslandsia 'Fire Magic'
 × Vrieslandsia 'Red Beacon'

References

BSI Cultivar Registry Retrieved 11 October 2009

ensiformis
Flora of Brazil